Chrysanthos of Madytos (c. 1770 – 1846) was a Greek poet, chanter, Archimandrite, and Archbishop, born in Madytos. In preparation of the first printed books of Orthodox chant, he was responsible for a reform of the Byzantine notation within the New Music School of the Patriarchate, along with Gregorios the Protopsaltes and Chourmouzios the Archivist who transcribed the traditional repertory into the Chrysanthine notation.

Life

Chrysanthos and the reform of Orthodox chant

Works 
 

.

Publications made in his name

Translations

See also
Neobyzantine Octoechos—Byzantine music
Ottoman classical music

Notes and references

Sources

External links 

Chrysanthos of Madytos Entry at Orthodox Wiki

Composers from the Ottoman Empire
Eastern Orthodox liturgical music
1770s births
1846 deaths
Year of birth uncertain
Music theorists
19th-century Greek people
Greeks from the Ottoman Empire
19th-century Eastern Orthodox bishops
People from Madytos
Male classical composers
18th-century Greek musicians
19th-century Greek musicians
18th-century Greek poets
18th-century Greek writers
19th-century Greek poets
19th-century Greek writers
19th-century male musicians
19th-century musicians